The Real Story is an American current affairs television program hosted by journalist Gretchen Carlson on the Fox News Channel.  Prior to its cancellation, the show was hosted by a rotation of anchors following the expiration of Carlson's contract with Fox News in late June 2016. During Carlson's tenure with the show, it was known as The Real Story with Gretchen Carlson.

Since its debut on September 30, 2013, the show was broadcast live from 2:00 p.m. to 3:00 p.m. ET.  The program was a replacement for America Live with Megyn Kelly  following Kelly's departure from that time slot to host her own Fox prime time program, The Kelly File.

The program aired its final episode on July 29, 2016. The following Monday, August 1, 2016, the show and its 'about' page was removed from Fox News' schedule and website. It was replaced by America's Election Headquarters hosted by Shannon Bream.

External links
 The Real Story at Fox News Insider
 

Fox News original programming
2013 American television series debuts
2016 American television series endings
2010s American television news shows
Current affairs shows
English-language television shows